Gözerek can refer to:

 Gözerek, Çermik
 Gözerek, Karakoçan